Richard Cunningham or Richie Cunningham may refer to:

 Richie Cunningham, a fictional character played by Ron Howard on the sitcom Happy Days
 Richard Cunningham (English Army officer) (d. 1696), achieved the rank of Brigadier-General
 Richie Cunningham (American football) (born 1970), former American football placekicker
 Richard Cunningham (botanist) (1793–1835), English botanist in New South Wales
 Richard Cunningham (actor), English actor
 Richard Cunningham (Canadian politician) (1748–1823), Irish-born farmer and political figure in Nova Scotia
 Richard Cunningham (American politician) (c. 1944–2021), American politician from Connecticut
 Rich Cunningham, American politician from Utah
 Dick Cunningham (American football) (Richard Karekin Cunningham), American football linebacker

See also
Rick Cunningham (disambiguation)
Dick Cunningham, American basketball player